The National Technological University – General Pacheco Regional Faculty (Castilian: Universidad Tecnológica Nacional - Facultad Regional General Pacheco (UTN-FRGP).

Careers

Degrees
 Engineering:
 Civil Engineering.
 Electrical Engineering.
 Mechanical Engineering.
 Automotive Engineering.
 Licentiate in Industrial Organisation.
 Licentiate in Mathematics Education.

Postgraduate Degrees
 Magisters:
 Specializations:

History 

This NTU College is one of the 24 regional faculties of the Universidad Tecnológica Nacional of Argentina.

Sources 

 

 Official website

General Pacheco